The Battle of Thessalonica was fought in the summer or autumn of 380 by Fritigern's Goths and a Roman army led by Theodosius I. Reconstituted after Adrianople, the East Roman army suffered another major defeat. Theodosius retreated to Thessalonica and surrendered control of operations to the Western Emperor, Gratian.

References

 Peter Heather, 1996. The Goths, Blackwell Publishers. .

380
Thessalonica 380
Thessalonica 380
Thessalonica 380
Thessalonica 380
Roman Thessalonica
380s in the Byzantine Empire
Thessalonica 380